Ryan Michael Carpenter (born January 18, 1991) is an American professional ice hockey center for the Hartford Wolf Pack in the American Hockey League (AHL) while under contract to the New York Rangers of the National Hockey League (NHL).

Playing career
Ryan Carpenter's family is from Staten Island, New York. Following in his father's footsteps, he was a New York Rangers fan as long as he can remember. Carpenter grew up in Orlando, Florida where he attended Timber Creek High School. In his youth hockey playing career he played for the Central Florida Hockey Club. He started his junior career with the Sioux City Musketeers in the USHL. He played two seasons with Sioux City before moving on to Bowling Green State University. Carpenter won BGSU Rookie of the Year, and was only one of four Falcons to play all 44 games during his rookie campaign.

On March 26, 2014, he signed with the San Jose Sharks as an undrafted free agent, and joined their minor league club, the Worcester Sharks. In his first full professional season in 2014–15, he scored 12 goals, 22 assists and had 34 points.

During his second season with the-now San Jose Barracuda in 2015–16, Carpenter led the Barracuda in points and assists through 20 AHL games, and was called up by the San Jose Sharks on December 11, 2015. He made his NHL debut on the Sharks fourth line, in a 2-0 defeat to the Minnesota Wild the following day. With the Barracuda, Carpenter finished the season leading the team on points, and also won the Yanick Dupre Memorial Award for community service. Helped by the AHL team falling in the first round of the 2016 playoffs, Carpenter remained on the Sharks roster as a possible back-up, seeing the franchise reach the 2016 Stanley Cup Finals.

During the following 2016–17 season, he scored his first goal in the NHL on November 30, 2016, in a game against the Los Angeles Kings.

The Sharks signed Carpenter to a two-year, $1.3 million contract extension on June 17, 2017. After appearing in 16 games with the Sharks during the 2017–18 season, Carpenter was placed on waivers on December 12. Carpenter was claimed the next day by the Vegas Golden Knights.

After playing for the Golden Knights in the franchise's first two seasons, Carpenter left as a free agent to sign a three-year, $3 million contract with the Chicago Blackhawks on July 1, 2019. He would score his first goal as a Blackhawk in a 4–3 win over the Boston Bruins.

In the  season, the Blackhawks traded Carpenter to the Calgary Flames in exchange for a fifth-round draft pick at the NHL trade deadline on March 21, 2022. A few weeks later, Carpenter got his first point as part of the Flames in a win against the Los Angeles Kings on April 4, 2022.

As a free agent from the Flames, Carpenter was signed to a one-year, $750,000 contract with the New York Rangers on July 14, 2022. On December 8, 2022, he was placed on waivers.

Personal life
Carpenter is a devout Christian and he participates in a chapter of Fellowship of Christian Athletes alongside Nick Holden. He is married to Alexis and they have three children together, two sons and a daughter.

Career statistics

Awards and honours

References

External links

1991 births
Living people
American men's ice hockey centers
Bowling Green Falcons men's ice hockey players
Calgary Flames players
Chicago Blackhawks players
Ice hockey people from Florida
People from Oviedo, Florida
Hartford Wolf Pack players
New York Rangers players
San Jose Barracuda players
San Jose Sharks players
Sioux City Musketeers players
Sportspeople from Seminole County, Florida
Timber Creek High School alumni
Undrafted National Hockey League players
Vegas Golden Knights players
Worcester Sharks players